Implantation may refer to:

 Implantation (embryology), in which an embryo adheres to the wall of the uterus
 Implant (medicine), insertion of implants
 Endometrial transplantation, as part of the theory of retrograde menstruation in endometriosis
 Ion implantation, insertion of ions, in semiconductor device fabrication
 Implantation bleeding
 Implantation of tooth
 Implantation rate
 Implantation spotting

See also 
Implant (disambiguation)